Hibbertia acerosa, commonly known as needle leaved guinea flower, is a species of flowering plant in the family Dilleniaceae and is endemic to the south-west of Western Australia.

Needle leaved guinea flower was first formally described in 1817 by de Candolle in Regni Vegetabilis Systema Naturale from an unpublished description by Robert Brown, and was given the name Pleurandra acerosa. Brown collected the type specimens near Lucky Bay. In 1863, George Bentham changed the name to Hibbertia acerosa in Flora Australiensis.

The species is endemic to the Wheatbelt, Peel, South West, Great Southern and coastal parts of the Mid West and Goldfields-Esperance regions of Western Australia where it gows in sandy or gravelly soils over or around granite or laterite.

See also
List of Hibbertia species

References

acerosa
Flora of Western Australia
Plants described in 1817
Taxa named by Alphonse Pyramus de Candolle